Katunga is a town in the Goulburn Valley region of northern Victoria, Australia. The town is located in the Shire of Moira local government area, 228 kilometres from the state capital, Melbourne.

Katunga Post Office opened on 10 June 1881.

The local railway station was opened on the Goulburn Valley railway in 1888,  but today does not see regular passenger services. Katunga, similar to much of the surrounding area, is based on agriculture, including dairy production. Bizarrely, the town had two state primary schools with around 90 students at Katunga primary and 7 students at Katunga South primary just 2 km away. Katunga South closed at the end of 2021 after the last 3 students left.

The Katunga Football Club competing in the Picola & District Football League is based in the town.

References

External links

Shire of Moira - Official website

Towns in Victoria (Australia)
Shire of Moira